Bríd Uí Murchú, Irish writer, fl. 1954.

Bríd Bean Uí Murchú was a native of Casla, Connemara, Ireland, She graduated from University College, Galway, with an M.A. in education. Her professional life was spent in the Galway region.

Bibliography

 Oideachas in Iar Connacht sa naoú céad déag, Dublin, 1954.

References

 Galway Authors, Helen Mahar, 1976

People from County Galway
Irish writers
Possibly living people
Year of birth missing (living people)